Patricia Maldonado may refer to:

Patricia Maldonado (singer) (born 1950), Chilean television presenter and singer
Patricia Maldonado (writer) (born 1956), Argentine-Brazilian television writer
Patricia Maldonado (swimmer) (born 1991), Venezuelan long-distance and open water swimmer